Joško Hajder (15 January 1994 – August 2022) was a Croatian footballer who played as a midfielder or forward. He last played for NK Omiš.

Club career
Passing through the ranks of the Hajduk Split youth academy, Hajder, an all-rounder playing mostly in the midfield and the attack, debuted for the first team in a 0-1 home loss on the 12.05.2012 to Lokomotiva Zagreb, coming in for the injured Mijo Caktaš, but never appeared again for the senior team.

After not being given a contract by Hajduk, he was signed by RNK Split and immediately sent on a loan to NK Imotski in the Treća HNL Jug. He was released during the winter period, and went on trial at NK Istra 1961, which he passed. Having impressed the coach Igor Pamić, he signed a 3.5 years contract with the Pula-based club.

References

1994 births
2022 deaths
Footballers from Split, Croatia
Association football midfielders
Association football forwards
Croatian footballers
HNK Hajduk Split players
RNK Split players
NK Imotski players
NK Istra 1961 players
NK Primorac 1929 players
NK Solin players
Croatian Football League players
Second Football League (Croatia) players